Bacillothrips is a genus of thrips in the family Phlaeothripidae.

Species
 Bacillothrips bagnalli
 Bacillothrips longiceps
 Bacillothrips nobilis

References

Phlaeothripidae
Thrips
Thrips genera